Maya Shatzmiller  is a historian whose scholarship focusses on the economic history of the Muslim world. She became a Fellow of the Royal Society of Canada in 2003. She received her PhD from the University of Provence in 1973, and was a visiting scholar at the Institute for Advanced Study in 1992. Shatzmiller is a professor of history at the University of Western Ontario.

Shatzmiller has critiqued the views of Timur Kuran, arguing that his scholarship paints a negative picture of Islam but does not show why some Muslim countries experience economic difficulties.

Publications

References

External links 
 Profile at the University of Western Ontario
 

21st-century Canadian historians
20th-century Canadian historians
Canadian women historians
Economic historians
Fellows of the Royal Society of Canada
Institute for Advanced Study visiting scholars
University of Provence alumni
Academic staff of the University of Western Ontario
Year of birth missing (living people)
Living people
20th-century Canadian women writers